Dowdy Ferry Road is the fifth album by the pop rock duo England Dan & John Ford Coley. The album's single "It's Sad to Belong" was a moderate pop hit and a #1 smash on the Adult Contemporary chart. A second hit from the LP, "Gone Too Far," reached #23 on the U.S. Billboard Hot 100. Being from the Dallas, Texas area, England Dan and John Ford Coley named Dowdy Ferry Road after a street in the southeastern part of town. Dowdy Ferry (Exit #476) connects with Interstate 20 in Texas.

Cash Box said of the single "Gone Too Far" that "Coley's melody and lyric work perfectly with the slick harmonies and tasteful instrumentation."

Track listing
"Dowdy Ferry Road" (Dan Seals) – 3:23
"It's Sad to Belong" (Randy Goodrum) – 2:54
"Soldier in the Rain" (John Ford Coley, Sunny Dalton) – 4:45
"Love is the One Thing We Hide" (Seals) – 2:53
"Gone Too Far" (Coley) – 2:58
"Where Do I Go From Here" (Parker McGee) – 2:59
"Falling Stars" (Coley) – 2:56
"You Know We Belong Together" (Coley, Seals) – 3:01
"Don't Feel That Way No More" (Seals) – 3:07
"Holocaust" (Seals) – 3:09

Personnel 
 John Ford Coley – acoustic guitar, keyboards, lead and backing vocals,
 England Dan Seals – acoustic guitar, lead and backing vocals
 Steve Gibson – acoustic guitar, electric guitar
 Bobby Thompson – acoustic guitar
 Doyle Grisham – steel guitar
 Shane Keister – keyboards, Moog synthesizer
 Kyle Lehning – keyboards
 Joe Osborn – bass
 Larrie Londin – drums, percussion
 Dennis Good – trombone 
 George Tidwell – trumpet
 Billy Puett – woodwinds
 Buddy Skipper – woodwinds, horn arrangements (1), woodwind arrangements (6, 8)
 Bergen White – string arrangements, woodwind arrangements (4, 10)
 The Shelly Kurland String Section – strings
 Sheri Kramer – backing vocals
 Lisa Silver – backing vocals
 Wendy Suits – backing vocals
 Diane Tidwell – backing vocals

Production
 Producer – Kyle Lehning
 Engineers – Kyle Lehning and Marshall Morgan 
 Recorded and Mixed at Hazen’s Recording Studio (Hendersonville, TN).
 Mastered by Glenn Meadows at Masterfonics (Nashville, TN).
 Art Direction – Bob Defrin
 Photography – Jim Houghton and Earl Steinbecker
 Management – Susan Joseph

References

1977 albums
England Dan & John Ford Coley albums
Albums produced by Kyle Lehning
Big Tree Records albums